Borut Maček (born 11 June 1966) is a Slovenian handball coach for the Iranian national team.

References

1966 births
Living people
Slovenian handball coaches
Place of birth missing (living people)